Maurilio Manara (born 12 September 1945), known professionally as Milo Manara, is an Italian comic book writer and artist.

Career
After architecture and painting studies, he made his comics debut in 1969 drawing for Genius, a Fumetti neri series of pocket books from publisher Furio Vanio in the wake of the popularity of Kriminal and Satanik. In 1970, he illustrated for the magazine Terror, and starting in 1971 drew the erotic series Jolanda de Almaviva written by Francisco Rubino, issued in small format by publisher Erregi. Joining the youth magazine , he worked with Rubino, Carlo Barbieri, Mino Milani and Silverio Pisú. Manara and Pisú later went on to publish Lo Scimmiotto (The Ape) along the story of the Chinese Monkey King in Alter Linus in 1976, and with Alfredo Castelli, L'Uomo delle Nevi (The Snowman) in 1978.

During this period Manara began publishing work in several Franco-Belgian comics magazines including Charlie Mensuel, Pilote and L'Écho des savanes. For (A SUIVRE) Manara created the first stories featuring HP and Giuseppe Bergman, which grew to become a large body of work. The character "HP" is based on Manara's friend, the Italian comics creator Hugo Pratt, and a collaborator on some of Manara's most acclaimed work, initially  (1983, Indian Summer) and later El Gaucho (1991). Manara also completed two stories working with another of his heroes, Federico Fellini. In his own right Manara has been commended on his skills as a writer, as with the western  (1982, The Paper Man).

In the following years of combining sequels, original work, and collaborations with noted creators, Manara's production continued in this direction to explore erotic comics themes with an artistic and storytelling expression in a manner considered unique to Manara.

In the U.S. The Ape was serialised in Heavy Metal in the early 1980s and Manara received some exposure through collaborations with Neil Gaiman and other artists.

Later work
In connection with their joint project Quarantasei, in July 2006, Manara designed a helmet for Moto GP rider Valentino Rossi, specifically made for the Italian GP in Mugello. Rossi declared:

In 2003, Manara's work featured on the cover of Scottish rock band Biffy Clyro's second studio album The Vertigo of Bliss. Manara also created the artwork for all the singles released from this album.

In October 2006, Manara developed character designs for the animated television series City Hunters. The series, of ten 11-minute episodes, blends traditional animation techniques with modern CGI, to be broadcast across all of Latin America on the FOX network throughout 2006 and 2007.

Manara penciled an X-Men project written by Chris Claremont for Marvel Comics called X-Men: Ragazze in fuga that released in April 2009 in Italy, and was later reprinted in short circulation by Marvel Comics in English as X-Women.

In 2013 he started to do low print variant covers for issues of Marvel comic books.

He was profiled in the 2011 documentary film Derailments (Deragliamenti).

Awards
 1998: Harvey Awards: Inducted into the Jack Kirby Hall of Fame
 2004: Eisner Award, with various artists for Best Anthology, for The Sandman: Endless Nights

Bibliography

Adaptations
Series
Click (1997)
City Hunters (2006, animated TV series created by Gastón Gorali & Alberto Stagnaro)
Films
Le Déclic (1985)
Le Parfum de l'invisible (1997 IMDb)
La Légende de Parva (2003)
The Erotic Misadventures of the Invisible Man (2003 IMDb)

See also 
 Fernando Carcupino
 Hugo Pratt
 Guido Crepax
 Italian comics

Notes

References

 Manara publications in (A SUIVRE) Pilote, L'Écho des Savanes'' and BoDoï – BDoubliées 
 Manara albums – Bedetheque  
 Manara publications in English – Europeancomics.net

External links

 
 
 
 Milo Manara biography on Lambiek Comiclopedia
 }
 Manara Eurotica catalog NBM Graphic Novels publisher
 
 
 

1945 births
Living people
People from Lüsen
Italian comics writers
Italian comics artists
Italian erotic artists